Stanley Roberts (19 April 1921 – April 1995) was a Welsh professional footballer, who played in the English football league for Wrexham and New Brighton.

References

1921 births
1995 deaths
Wrexham A.F.C. players
New Brighton A.F.C. players
Ellesmere Port Town F.C. players
Association football forwards
Welsh footballers